Narborough may refer to:

Places
 Narborough, Leicestershire, England
 Narborough Hall
 Narborough Road, Leicester
 Narborough, Norfolk, England
 Narborough, Northamptonshire, a historical name for Northborough, Cambridgeshire, England

Other uses
 John Narborough (c. 1640–1688), British rear admiral
 HMS Narborough, two ships of the Royal Navy and one planned one, named after Sir John Narborough